Stay Alive is an American slasher film released by Hollywood Pictures in 2006.

Stay Alive may also refer to:

Music
 "Stay Alive (song)" a 2022 song by Jungkook
 "Stay Alive", a song from the 2015 Broadway musical Hamilton
 "Stay Alive", a song by Bachman-Turner Overdrive from Head On
 "Stay Alive", a song by Basshunter from The Old Shit album
 "Stay Alive", a song by Poison from Native Tongue 
 "Stay Alive", a song by Trapt from Trapt Live!
 "Stay Alive", a song used as an end theme in the anime series Re:Zero − Starting Life in Another World
 Stay Alive (Laura Jane Grace album), a 2020 album by Laura Jane Grace
 Stay Alive (Nina album), a 2011 Philippine album by Nina

Other uses
 Stay Alive (game), a strategy game

See also
 Staying Alive (disambiguation)